The native form of this personal name is Nagy Mihály. This article uses Western name order when mentioning individuals.

Mihály Nagy (born Debrecen, Hungary, 24 January 1937) Mikola Sándor Prize winner, high school teacher; research teacher; high school principal; university doctor; mineralogist; meteorite researcher; Honorary Ph.D.

Studies 
Mihály Nagy completed his secondary school studies at the  Debreceni Református Kollégium gimnáziuma graduating in 1955. He graduated from the Faculty of Science of the University of Debrecen in 1959 with a degree in chemistry and physics. In addition to his teaching work, he was awarded a scholarship by the Hungarian Academy of Sciences in 1969.

For four years, once a week, he worked as a fellow researcher and then as a visiting researcher at Institute for Nuclear Research (Atommag Kutató Intézet - ATOMKI) in Debrecen.

Nagy was awarded in 1974 as a doctor of science at the University of Debrecen summa cum laude. As a result of his decades-long working and research relationship with the University of Debrecen's Department of Mineralogy and Geology, on the proposal of the department, the Council and Dean of University of Debrecen's Természettudományi és Technológiai Kar Tanácsa awarded him the title of Honorary Associate Professor in 2020.

Career 
Nagy's only job from 1959 until his retirement was at the Debreceni Református Kollégium gimnáziuma, where he taught physics and chemistry. 

From 1987 to 1992 he was deputy headmaster, and from 1992 until his retirement in 1996 he was headmaster of his alma mater.

Work

Scientific activity

Nuclear research 
Nagy, as a scholarship holder of the Hungarian Academy of Sciences, in addition to his teaching work, he also did research work at Institute for Nuclear Research in Debrecen. He has published in several well-known domestic and foreign scientific journals. In 1974, using these, he wrote and defended his doctoral dissertation entitled Ancient Track Investigations and Nuclear Physics Experiments in High School with a Solid-State Trace Detector.

Scientific playhouse 
Between 1984 and 1996, he was elected secretary of the Hajdú-Bihar county group of the Eötvös Loránd Fizikai Társulat (ELFT). In 1986, he became the national vice president of ELFT for four years. After that, he was the co-chairman of the Hajdú-Bihar county organization of the Műszaki és Természettudományi Egyesületek Szövetsége (MTESz)  between 1990 and 1998. He has been the chairman of the board of trustees of the „Varázskuckó Debrecen” Természettudományos Játszóház Alapítvány, a natural science playhouse foundation, which operated the playhouse, for sixteen years since 2001.

Research on the Kaba meteorite 
Since 2010, Mihály Nagy was increasingly involved in meteorite research. This may be due to the fact that the world-famous Kaba meteorite is kept in the museum of the Reformed College of Debrecen, where he was also a high school principal. According to his definition, the cosmological study of meteorites offers information about the period of the formation of the solar system. He has published books and studies based on his research, and his outstanding research achievement was the presentation of the meteorite's layered structure on SEM and CT images. He  has given numerous scientific and scientific-educational lectures at international conferences, universities, colleges, conferences of the ELFT and the Magyarhoni Földtani Társulat, in-service teacher training, and houses of culture.

Church, public activity 
Nagy was one of the elders of the Reformed Church of Debrecen-Csapókert between 1957 and 1964, then he became the elder of the Reformed Church of Debrecen-Nagytemplom from 1969 for thirty years. He was one of the elders of the Reformed Church of Debrecen-Nagyerdő between 1965 and 2006, and then became an honorary presbyter there.

From 1978 he was the presidential chief notary of the Reformed Diocese of Debrecen, then from 1996 to 2008 he was its custodian. From 1991 to 1997, he was elected president of the reorganized Országos Református Tanáregyesület, and from 1997 he was elected honorary president.

He was the regional president of the Magyar Református Presbiteri Szövetség between 2002 and 2006, and from 2014 to 2021 he was the pedagogical advisor of the national association.

Family 
Nagy is a descendant of an old Debrecen family, his father was a local craftsman and merchant.

In 1959 he married Erika Nyáry, a teacher majoring in Hungarian, Latin and Russian.

They have three children, seven grandchildren, three great-grandchildren.

Awards, recognitions 

 XIII. Országos Középiskolai Fizikatanári Ankét – I. Díj. Az alfa részecskékkel bemutatható nyomdetektoros kísérletekért (Eötvös Loránd Fizikai Társulat) 1970
 Országos Pedagógiai Újítási Ankét és kiállítás Debrecen - megosztott I. Díj. Atomfizikai tanítási egység szemléltetése diafilmen. (Pedagógus Továbbképzési Intézet) 1973
 Mikola Sándor-díj – A kísérletezésen alapuló kiemelkedő fizikatanításért (ELFT) 1976
 XXVI. Országos Középiskolai Fizikatanári Ankét I. Díj. A Nukleáris Nyomdetektoros Alapkészletért (ELFT) 1983
   Vermes Miklós Díj – A tehetségápoló fizikatanításért (Vermes Miklós Tehetséggondozó Alapítvány, Sopron) 1993
 Hatvani István Díj – For outstanding activity in the field of natural sciences for the benefit of the city of Debrecen (Debrecen County Municipality) 1995
 Silver Cross of Merit of the Republic of Hungary (President of the Republic of Hungary) 1996
 Kerekes Ferenc Díj (Board of the Debrecen Reformed College) 2000
 Imre Sándor Díj (12th Synod of the Hungarian Reformed Church) 2003
 Knight's Cross of the Hungarian Order of Merit (President of the Republic of Hungary) 2012
 Honorary associate professor (Council and Dean of the Faculty of Science and Technology of the University of Debrecen) 2020

Publication

Books 

 Magfizikai kísérletek nukleáris nyomdetektorral Fakultatív tankönyv a gimnáziumok IV. osztálya számára. (Műszaki Könyvkiadó Bp.) 1985.; 2. kiadás (Tankönyvkiadó Bp.) 1987
 Atommagfizika (In Fizikai kísérletek gyűjteménye 3. Egyetemi-főiskolai tankönyv) 1996 (Vol. 3. p. 89-121)
 Színek, fények és formák az ásványok világában (Debreceni Egyetem, Kossuth Egyetemi Kiadó; Debreceni Református Kollégium) 2000 Published in Hungarian, English and German
 Szőnyi Pál. Tudós tanárok – tanár tudósok Series Editor: Jáki László (Országos Pedagógiai Könyvtár és Múzeum) 2001
 Ásványok a Bibliában (Debreceni Református Kollégium; Országos Református Tanáregyesület) 2003
 A Kaba-kő titka Tudománytörténeti színjáték 15 jelenetben (Református Tiszántúl kiadványai 3. kötet) Co-author: Kirsch Éva. Series Editor: Fekete Károly. 2007
 A kabai meteorit – The meteorite of Kaba (Debreceni Református Kollégium) 2008
 Felhők fölött a Nap – Pedagógiai tapasztalatok, visszaemlékezések (Debreceni Református Kollégium) 2013.; 2. javított, bővített kiadás (Magyar Református Presbiteri Szövetség) 2017
 Átfogó kutatások a kabai meteoriton – Comprehensive research on Kaba meteorite. Acta Geoscientia Debrecina 1. különszám (Debreceni Egyetemi Kiadó) Edited by Mihály Nagy - Péter Rózsa - Richard William McIntosh. 2018 (p. 7-8.; 17-18) 
 A review of a carbonaceous chondrite: what can we learn from the Kaba meteorite? Co-author: Arpad, Csamer ; Gucsik, Arnold ; Jozsef, Vanyo ; Diana, Skita ; Peter, Rozsa ; Gabor, Zelei IN: The 10th Symposium on Polar Science. 2019 
 A hit és a tudomány határán (Magyar Református Presbiteri Szövetség) 2021 2. javított, bővített kiadás (Tiszántúli Református Egyházkerület) 2022

Studies 
A selection of more than 200 published articles and 86 international scientific publications

 Szilárdtest nyomdetektorok az oktatásban Co-authors: G. Somogyi - L. Medveczky (Fizikai Szemle) 1971/11 (p. 344-354)
 Remarks on fission-track dating in dielectric solids Co-author: G. Somogyi (Radiation Effects) 1972. (Vol 16, p. 223-231)
 A debreceni Kollégium Szőnyi-féle ásványgyűjteménye Co-author: Szakáll S. (A debreceni Déri Múzeum évkönyve 1980) 1983. (p. 35-72.)
 Nukleáris nyomdetektoros alapkészlet a magfizika oktatásához (A Fizika Tanítása) 1983/6. (p. 180-184)
 A fizika és a 450 éves Debreceni Református Kollégium (Fizikai Szemle) 1989/3 (p. 96-104)
 Mineral Collection of the Calvinist College in Debrecen (Annals of the History of Hungarian Geology Special Issue 3.) 1991. (p. 313-320)
 Szőnyi Pál, az 1848-as vallás- és nevelésügyi minisztérium tanácsosa (Debreceni Szemle) 1998/3. (p. 347-366)
 Bay Zoltánra emlékezett a Debreceni Református Kollégium (Confessio A Magyarországi Református Egyház Figyelője) 1999/1. (p. 61-68)
 Ásványok a Bibliában – It was published in 26 consecutive parts in Reformátusok Lapja from 19.11.2000 to 19.12.2001.
 Százötven éve hullott a világhírű kaba-debreceni lebkő. (Fizikai Szemle) 2007/12. (p. 395)
 Minerals from the Reformed College of in the University of Debrecen Co-author: R. W. McIntosh ACTA GGM Debrecina Geology, Geomorphology, Physical Geography. Series, Vol 6-7. 2012. (71-80.o.)
 A kabai meteorit leírása részletgazdag fényképek alapján - Description ok Kaba meteorite based on detail rich photographs. Co-author: Nagy Sándor IN: Átfogó kutatások a kabai meteoriton – Comprehensive Research on Kaba Meteorite (Debreceni Egyetemi Kiadó) 2018. (p. 71-80)
 Régi és új eredmények összekapcsolása a kabai meteorit kutatásában: A test réteges szerkezete a SEM és a CT felvételeken – Linking Old and New Resulrs in Kaba Meteorite Research: Layered structure of the meteorite body on SEM, and CT images. Co-author: Bérczi Szaniszló IN: Átfogó kutatások a kabai meteoriton – Comprehensive Research on Kaba Meteorite (Debreceni Egyetemi Kiadó) 2018. (p. 91-96)
 Determination of Chemical Components of Kaba Meteorite by LDI Ionization Methods Using a 15T FT -ICR Mass Spectrometer – LDI és ESI ionizációs 15T FT-ICR tömegspektrométer alkalmazása a kabai meteorit kémiai összetevőinek meghatározására Co-authors: Árpád Somogyi - József Posta IN: Átfogó kutatások a kabai meteoriton – Comprehensive Research on Kaba Meteorite (Debreceni Egyetemi Kiadó) 2018. (p. 169-178)
 Dokumentumok a kabai meteorit történetéből – Documents from history of Kaba Meteorite IN: Átfogó kutatások a kabai meteoriton – Comprehensive Research on Kaba Meteorite (Debreceni Egyetemi Kiadó) 2018. (p. 195-237)

References 

1937 births
Living people
Hungarian Calvinist and Reformed Christians
Debrecen
Meteorite minerals
University of Debrecen alumni